Seedorf is a municipality in the district of Rotenburg, in Lower Saxony, Germany.

History 
From 1963 to 2006, it hosted the 41st Mechanized Brigade of the Dutch Army. On August 1, 2006, the military unit was disbanded and the base was transferred to Germany, where it became the new base of Bundeswehr's 31st Airborne Brigade.

References

Municipalities in Lower Saxony